Bambang Suprianto (born 20 February 1969) is a retired badminton player from Indonesia.

Career 
A durable all around player who won singles at the Singapore Open in 1991, Suprianto's greatest success came in doubles events. In the mid-1990s he and fellow countryman Rudy Gunawan formed one of the world's leading men's doubles teams. They won several top tier international titles, including the 1994 All-England Championship, but could not quite keep pace with countrymen Rexy Mainaky and Ricky Subagja who became the decade's most successful pair. Suprianto was a member of Indonesia's world champion Thomas Cup (men's international) teams in 1994, 1996 and 2002.

After Rudy Gunawan's retirement, Suprianto focused on mixed doubles and continued his high level of play by winning international titles with a variety of partners. He and Zelin Resiana narrowly missed a medal at the 2000 Olympics in Sydney, Australia. Late in his international career, Suprianto teamed with another mixed doubles specialist, Tri Kusharjanto to gain a very unexpected men's doubles victory at the 2001 Asian Championships over the reigning Olympic champions Tony Gunawan and Candra Wijaya in the final, and previously in 2000 won the mixed doubles event with Minarti Timur.

Personal life 
Bambang Suprianto brother, Joko Suprianto, also a retired Indonesian badminton player who success in the singles event.

Achievements

World Cup 
Men's doubles

Asian Championships 
Men's doubles

Mixed doubles

Asian Cup 
Men's singles

Men's doubles

Southeast Asian Games 
Men's doubles

Mixed doubles

IBF World Grand Prix 
The World Badminton Grand Prix sanctioned by International Badminton Federation (IBF) from 1983 to 2006.

Men's singles

Men's doubles

Mixed doubles

IBF International 
Men's singles

Men's doubles

Mixed doubles

References

External links 
 

1969 births
Living people
People from Surakarta
Sportspeople from Central Java
Indonesian male badminton players
Badminton players at the 1996 Summer Olympics
Badminton players at the 2000 Summer Olympics
Olympic badminton players of Indonesia
Badminton players at the 1994 Asian Games
Badminton players at the 2002 Asian Games
Asian Games gold medalists for Indonesia
Asian Games silver medalists for Indonesia
Asian Games medalists in badminton
Medalists at the 1994 Asian Games
Medalists at the 2002 Asian Games
Competitors at the 2001 Southeast Asian Games
Southeast Asian Games silver medalists for Indonesia
Southeast Asian Games medalists in badminton
20th-century Indonesian people